William Charles Morris (March 6, 1874 – April 10, 1940) was an American political cartoonist. Born in Salt Lake City, Utah, he began his career with the Salt Lake Herald and later worked as cartoonist with The Spokesman-Review in Spokane, from 1904 to 1913, after which he worked for such publications as New-York Tribune, New York Mail, the George Matthew Adams Syndicate, and Harper's Weekly. He was on the publicity staff of the Republican National Committee during the 1936 presidential campaign. He died of heart attack at Nyack, New York, April 10, 1940, at age 66.

Works

References

External links

1874 births
1940 deaths
Artists from Salt Lake City
American editorial cartoonists
American illustrators
Artists from Washington (state)
New York (state) Republicans